Shawn T. Flaherty is a former Democratic member of the Pennsylvania House of Representatives for the 30th legislative district. He was first elected in a special election in 2006 to fill the remainder of Jeff Habay's term. That November, Flaherty was defeated by Randy Vulakovich.

Flaherty, the eldest son of former Pittsburgh Mayor Pete Flaherty, graduated from Carnegie Mellon University in 1981 and earned a law degree from the Duquesne University School of Law in 1985. He founded the Pittsburgh-based law firm Woodruff, Flaherty & Fardo LLC with attorney and former Steeler Dwayne D. Woodruff.

External links 
Flaherty Fardo, LLC - Shawn T. Flaherty attorney profile
Flaherty Fardo, LLC - Shawn T. Flaherty Lawfirm Website
Pennsylvania House Democratic Caucus - Representative Shawn Flaherty official Party website (archived)

References

Living people
Members of the Pennsylvania House of Representatives
Place of birth missing (living people)
Year of birth missing (living people)